One Cold Night is a live album by South African rock band Seether. It was released on 11 July 2006, that features 12 acoustic tracks plus bonus DVD footage recorded in Philadelphia, Pennsylvania at the Grape Street Club on 22 February 2006. The album includes live acoustic renditions of songs from the band's Fragile, Disclaimer, and Karma and Effect albums, a cover song, and a remixed version of "The Gift".

Track listing

Notes
The songs "Needles" and "Burrito"  from this show were used as iTunes bonus track because the record company did not want obscenities on the retail version of the album. 
"Needles" was later featured on the Masters of Horror II soundtrack while "Burrito" was featured on the Lost Boys: The Tribe soundtrack.

The DVD features an in-depth interview with the band as well as a behind-the-scenes from their video shoot of "The Gift" among other features.

Personnel
Shaun Morgan – lead vocals, rhythm guitar
Dale Stewart – bass, backing vocals (lead guitar on "Broken")
John Humphrey – drums
Pat Callahan – lead guitar (bass on "Broken")

Charts

References

Seether albums
2006 live albums
2006 video albums
Live video albums
Wind-up Records live albums
Wind-up Records video albums